Opinion polling in the Canadian federal election of 2006 (held on 23 January 2006) showed a long period of variable support for the governing Liberal Party of Canada and opposition Conservative Party of Canada.  Prior to and throughout much of the campaign, the Liberals held a small lead over the Conservatives; as of early January 2006, the Conservatives had taken the lead.  This was confirmed on election day when the Conservatives won a plurality of votes and seats, being empowered to form a minority government in the 39th Canadian parliament.



Summary
In the leadup to the 2006 federal election, several opinion polls were commissioned to gauge the voting intentions of Canadians, particularly in the wake of Jean Brault's testimony at the Gomery Commission on 7 April 2005. The results of these polls showed a dip in support for the Liberals, which encouraged the Conservatives to seek an early election by tabling a non-confidence motion. However, Liberal support recovered following an agreement with the New Democratic Party (NDP) to support some changes to the federal budget and a number of incidents involving Conservative Member of Parliament (MP) Gurmant Grewal that hurt the Conservatives.  Consistently since the Brault testimony, the polls have indicated that an election would result in an increase in the number of seats for the Bloc Québécois and NDP, and cyclical gains and losses for the Conservatives inversely to the Liberals.

In November 2005, the first report by Justice John Gomery was released to the public; subsequently, the poll numbers for the Liberals again dropped.  Just days later, a new poll (Strategic Counsel: 6 November 2005) showed the Liberals were already bouncing back.  On 28 November 2005, the minority Liberal government succumbed to another Conservative non-confidence motion supported by the three opposition parties and the writs for an election were dropped.  The Conservatives achieved near parity but, early in the campaign, again fell back behind the Liberals.  Renewed accusations of corruption and impropriety at the end of 2005 – amid Royal Canadian Mounted Police (RCMP) criminal probes concerning possible government leaks regarding income trust tax changes and advertising sponsorships – led to an upswing of Conservative support again and gave them a lead over the Liberals, portending a possible change in government.

Polling figures for the NDP increased slightly, while Bloc figures experienced a slight dip; figures for the Green Party did not change appreciably throughout the campaign.

Poll results

The dates listed are normally the date the survey was concluded.  Most news and political affairs sources use the convention of using the last date that the poll was conducted in order to establish the inclusion/exclusion of current events.

 Strategic Counsel polls from 27 November onwards are multi-day polls.  Each new poll removes approximately 1/3 of the data that is the oldest, and replaces it with new data from that day.
 Nanos polls from December onwards are 3-day polls.  Each new poll removes the 1/3 of the data that is the oldest, and replaces it with new data from that day.
 Various EKOS polls contain results from a single night of polling only. They have fewer respondents than most other polls and, thus, EKOS notes that they are not as credible; however, they are intended to provide a general indication of daily polling trends.
 This Compas poll was taken over the course of a single day.
 Polling for this data mostly occurred before Jean Brault's Gomery Inquiry testimony was released.

NB: The margin of error in these surveys is typically between 2.5 and 3.5 percentage points, 19 times out of 20.  See the links for actual error values associated with particular surveys.  Because these figures are national percentages, they may not reflect the expected number of seats won by each party. Indeed, the sample size in many polls is not sufficient to give a statistically accurate prediction in individual ridings, and hence the expected number of seats.

All polling companies rely on cooperation from individuals contacted over the phone. The major companies claim a typical response rate is between 20 and 35 percent.

Seat predictions
Several websites, polling firms and notable Canadians devised various method of projecting the final election result.  Included below are those cited in Andrew Coyne's blog.

See also 
2006 Canadian federal election
 Opinion polling in the Canadian federal election, 2008
 Opinion polling in the Canadian federal election, 2011
 Opinion polling in the Canadian federal election, 2015

References

External links 
Letter from the editor in chief of CBC News entitled, "Beyond polls: Shining a light on public policy" (16 January 2006). Feedback requested.
Election Prediction Project
Pollingreport.ca
Election Almanac – Canada Federal Election
democraticSPACE Poll Projections
democraticSPACE Predictions
Nomination Watch
Politics Canada
Hill and Knowlton election predictor
Canada elections links wiki via Democracies Online
Laurier Institute for the Study of Public Opinion and Policy: Votes Into Seats: House Projection

2006 general election
2006 Canadian federal election
Canada